The College of Sciences at the Georgia Institute of Technology is one of the six colleges at the institute.

History

Until 1990, there was no independent college for the sciences. Before then, there had been three colleges: the College of Engineering, the College of Management, and College of Science and Liberal Studies (COSALS). As part of his restructuring plan, John Patrick Crecine reorganized the institute; he split COSALS into the College of Sciences and combined the liberal arts and management programs into the Ivan Allen College of Management and Liberal Arts. The latter would be split by G. Wayne Clough in 1998.

Schools

School of Biological Sciences
School of Chemistry and Biochemistry
School of Earth and Atmospheric Sciences
School of Mathematics
School of Physics
School of Psychology

Degrees

Undergraduate
Almost all of the undergraduate degrees offered by the College of Sciences have concentration options and/or a "business plan."
 B.S. in Biology
 B.S. in Chemistry
 B.S. in Earth and Atmospheric Science
 B.S. in Applied Mathematics
 B.S. in Discrete Mathematics
 B.S. in Applied Physics
 B.S. in Physics

Master’s
 M.S. in Prosthetics and Orthotics
 M.S. in Biology
 M.S. in Bioinformatics
 M.S. in Chemistry
 M.S. in Paper Science and Engineering
 M.S. in Earth and Atmospheric Science
 M.S. with a Major in Earth and Atmospheric Sciences
 5-year B.S. M.S. in Earth and Atmospheric Science
 M.S. in Mathematics
 M.S. in Statistics
 M.S. in Quantitative and Computational Finance
 M.S. in Applied Physics
 M.S. in Physics
 M.S. in Applied Psychology
 M.S. in Human Computer Interaction

Doctoral
 Ph.D. in Applied Physiology
 Ph.D. in Biology
 Ph.D. in Bioinformatics
 Ph.D. in Chemistry
 Ph.D. in Paper Science and Engineering
 Ph.D. in Earth and Atmospheric Science
 Ph.D. in Algorithms, Combinatorics, Optimization
 Ph.D. in Mathematics
 Ph.D. in Physics
 Ph.D. in Engineering Psychology
 Ph.D. in Experimental Psychology
 Ph.D. in Industrial/Organizational Psychology

References

External links
College of Sciences

College of Sciences